Kapsa Monastery is an Eastern Orthodox monastery situated on the southeast coast of Crete, between the villages of Makrys Gialos and Sitia in the west and Goudouras and Ierapetra in the east. It is built on a steep, rocky mountainside near the exit of the Perivolakia gorge, which overlooks the Libyan Sea.

History

Kapsa monastery was most probably established in the fifteenth century, although no exact date of its founding is known. In 1471, Ottoman pirates raided the monastery and destroyed a large part of it. In 1841, it was rebuilt by a famous monk, Joseph Gerakionts who spent his last years in a nearby cave. Moni Kapsa is a metochion of Toplou monastery. During the Axis occupation of Crete, the monastery often sheltered Greek partisans and allied soldiers of the Allies.

Architecture
The main building (katholikon) is a two-nave church dedicated to St. John the Baptist.

Current status
Today, Kapsa functions as a monastery for male monks.

References

Buildings and structures in Lasithi
Monasteries in Crete
Greek Orthodox monasteries in Greece